Frovatriptan, sold under the brand name Frova, is a triptan drug developed by Vernalis for the treatment of migraine headaches and for short term prevention of menstrual migraine.  The product is licensed to Endo Pharmaceuticals in North America and Menarini in Europe.

Medical uses
Frovatriptan is used in the treatment of migraine.

Available forms
It is available as 2.5 mg tablets.

Contraindications
Frovatriptan should not be given to patients with:
 Ischemic heart disease
 Cerebrovascular syndrome
 Peripheral vascular disease
 Uncontrolled hypertension
 Hemiplegic or basilar migraine

Side effects
Rare, but serious cardiac events have been reported in patients with risk factors predictive of CAD. These include: coronary artery vasospasm, transient myocardial ischemia, myocardial infarction, ventricular tachycardia and ventricular fibrillation.

Pharmacology

Pharmacodynamics

Frovatriptan is a serotonin receptor agonist, with high affinity for the 5-HT1B/1D receptors. It has no significant effects on the GABAA mediated channel activity and benzodiazepine binding sites. Frovatriptan inhibits excessive dilation of arteries that supply blood to the head.

Pharmacokinetics
Frovatriptan has a terminal elimination half-life of approximately 26 hours, making it the longest within its class.

Society and culture

US licensing
Frovatriptan is available only by prescription in the United States and Canada, where a secondary New Drug Approval (sNDA) was filed in July 2006.

References

External links
 Frova (manufacturer's website)
 Frovatriptan Succinate  (patient information)
 FDA labeling

5-HT1B agonists
5-HT1D agonists
5-HT7 agonists
Amines
Carbazoles
Carboxamides
Triptans